The Submarine Escape Training Facility (SETF), also known as the Submarine Escape and Rescue Centre (SERC), is a facility used by submariners of the Royal Australian Navy (RAN) to train in the techniques needed to escape from a submarine in trouble.

Background

Both were lost during World War I; AE1 disappearing with all hands. In the inter-war years, the RAN operated six J class submarines, then two Odin class submarines. After a long break, six British-designed Oberon class were purchased; the RAN relied entirely on the Royal Navy for their expertise in submarine escape methods and equipment. Communications between the two nations showed some breakdown during the 1980s, and with the introduction of the Collins class submarines, the RAN had a need to establish their own institutional knowledge in these techniques.

Facility
The SETF is the only submarine escape training system in the southern hemisphere, and one of only six operational worldwide.

The SETF was originally manned solely by the RAN. However, the regular reposting of instructors caused a knowledge drain; to counteract this, the RAN contracted civilian diving companies to provide the training. Management of the facility was contracted to Australian Submarine Corporation (ASC), with its partner Hyperbaric Health Pty. Ltd. (HH), but in January 2009, The Australian newspaper reported that the SETF had sat unused since May 2008 because of a contract dispute between ASC and the RAN. RAN personnel were sent to Canada for escape training until March 2011, when the SETF reopened.

Training
Escape training is generally a five-day course. The course culminates in a free ascent in the facility's  vertical freshwater tank, with only one attempt permitted. New submarine trainees have to pass the course before they can be posted to a submarine, and submariners must requalify every three years.

Prior to 1995, candidates were required to perform two buoyant ascents from 9 metres, one buoyant ascent from 22 metres wearing the submarine escape jerkin, one hooded ascent in the compartment from 22 metres, and two hooded ascents in the tower from 22 metres.

Citations

References
Books and journals

News articles

Royal Australian Navy bases
Military education and training in Australia
Military installations in Western Australia
1987 establishments in Australia
Military installations established in 1987
Military Units in Western Australia